Public holidays are celebrated by the entire population of Egypt. Holidays in Egypt have many classifications. Some holidays are religious and others are secular, while some can be fixed holidays on the calendar while others are movable. There are four Islamic holidays and two Christian holidays. The National Day of Egypt is celebrated on July, 23 which coincides with the annual celebration of the Egyptian revolution of 1952 when the modern republic of Egypt was declared, ending the period of the Kingdom of Egypt.

Government offices and ministries in Egypt rest on Friday of each week. In addition, banks and many institutes have non-working days on Saturday too which is an official resting-day or Sunday which is not official but commonly used as a resting-day by non-governmental institutes and shops with Christian religious observance. Some barbershops and hairdressers close their shops on Monday instead of Friday, Saturday and Sunday when they keep their shops open.

National holidays 
The following holidays are celebrated across the country, where government offices and ministries are closed. These holidays are either national secular holidays or important religious holidays.

Fixed holidays
The following holidays occur annually on a fixed day of the calendar:

Some government-related offices, including most universities, are also closed on the Coptic Orthodox date of Epiphany, 19 January.

Movable holidays

The following days are public holidays but the date on which each occurs varies, either because the date is fixed relative to the lunar Islamic calendar or (in the case of Sham El Nessim) has no fixed date in any calendar. In order in which they occur:

References

External links 
 
 

 
Egyptian culture
Egypt
Holidays